Ivan Petrovich Panchenko (born January 27, 1968), known as The Svetlograd Maniac, is a Russian rapist and serial killer.

Biography 
Panchenko was born on January 27, 1968, in Svetlogorsk. In 1986, he was convicted for desertion from the military unit and theft. He was also twice convicted for the acquisition and possession of drugs, and for the murder of a colleague with whom he deserted together. After the murder, Panchenko was hiding in a dugout in the forest.

After returning from the colony, Panchenko began his murder spree. On September 30, 1998, he shot his 18-year-old sister-in-law on the banks of the Kalaus River, then drowned the body. Four months later, he kidnapped his wife's 16-year-old younger sister, whom he held in the dugout for three years, repeatedly raping her before eventually killing her. Four months after that, he killed a 15-year-old friend of the second victim. However, Panchenko was soon detained and convicted for the murder of a colleague. He was released on parole in May 2007.

On October 5, 2008, Panchenko's son brought home two girls, 8 and 11 years old, whom Ivan lured into the dugout and locked in. He began to torture the younger girl, in the end eventually brutally beating her and burying her alive. He then planted a seedling at the burial site. During the day, he raped the 11-year-old girl, forcing her to wear a dog collar around her neck, but the police officers called by her parents managed to locate him with the help of a service dog. Panchenko was arrested on October 6, 2008.

Panchenko soon confessed to everything, including the murders from 10 years ago. During a search of his home, women's belongings were found which belonged to the victims. The forensic psychiatric examination recognized Panchenko as sane, and responsible for his actions. The investigation into the "Svetlograd Maniac" case was held in closed session and within the shortest time frame possible. On April 3, 2009, the Stavropol Regional Court sentenced Ivan Panchenko to life imprisonment and a fine of 800,000 rubles. The Supreme Court of Russia upheld the verdict without change. He is serving his sentence in the Polar Owl prison.

In the media 
 In 2009, the documentary film "On the maniac's tracks" from the series "Honest Detective" was created.

See also
 List of Russian serial killers

References 

1968 births
Living people
Male serial killers
Russian murderers of children
Russian rapists
Russian serial killers
Soviet murderers of children
Soviet rapists
Soviet serial killers